The 2010 Asia Cup (also known as Micromax Asia Cup) was the tenth edition of the Asia Cup cricket tournament, which was held in Sri Lanka from 15 to 24 June 2010. Only the test playing nations India, Pakistan, Sri Lanka and Bangladesh were taking part in the competition. India defeated Sri Lanka by 81 runs in the final to win a record 5th Asia Cup title. Pakistani captain, Shahid Afridi was declared the man of the tournament for scoring the most runs in the tournament, 265, with an average of 88.33 and a strike rate of 164.59.

Trophy
The trophy was made of a combination of silver, gold, copper and brass with a silver finish with mat and gloss finish. It stands to communicate the strength, purity, humility and persistence that not only represents the four metals but also the four participating nations.

Venue

Rangiri Dambulla International Stadium was the only venue of Asia Cup 2010 as other stadiums in Sri Lanka, including the R. Premadasa Stadium, were undergoing renovation for the 2011 Cricket World Cup. All seven matches were Day/Night affairs.

Rangiri Dambulla International Stadium is a 16,800 seat cricket stadium in Sri Lanka. The Stadium is situated in the Central Province, close to Dambulla on a 60-acre (240,000 m2) site leased from the Rangiri Dambulla Temple. The stadium is built overlooking the Dambulla Tank (reservoir) and the Dambulla Rock.

Squads
The squads of the four teams participating in the tournament were announced in early June by the respective cricket boards.

Fixtures

Group stage
Each side played each other once in the group stages. The top 2 teams based on points at the end of the group stages meet each other in a one-off final. Each win yielded 4 points while a tie/no result yielded 1-point. A bonus point system was also in place, where a team could earn an extra point, in addition to the four received from a win, for a total of 5 points if they achieved victory using 80% or less of available overs or kept the opposition score to less than 80% of their own.

Table

Matches
All times local (UTC+05:30)

Final

Dinesh Karthik was declared the Man of the Match for his match winning innings of 66 off 84 balls while Pakistan's Shahid Afridi was declared Man of the Series for scoring 265 runs in 3 matches during the tournament.

Media coverage

Television

Broadband

References

External links
 Asia Cup 2010 from Cricinfo

2010
2010 in Sri Lankan cricket
International cricket competitions in 2010
Cricket, Asia Cup, 2010
International cricket competitions in Sri Lanka